Verdussen is a Flemish or Dutch surname. Notable people with the surname include:

Jan Peeter Verdussen (1700–1763), Flemish painter
Pieter Verdussen (1662 – after 1710), Flemish painter and draftsman

See also
Verdussen family, a family of printers and book sellers active in Antwerp in the 17th and 18th centuries